Pradeeban Peter-Paul (born May 17, 1977) is a Tamil Canadian table tennis player.

Born in Colombo, Sri Lanka, Pradeeban Peter-Paul emigrated with his family to Germany at the age of 11. It was in Würzburg, Germany that Peter-Paul learned table tennis. When he left Germany in 1993 he was on the Bavarian provincial team and had won a junior doubles title. He started playing by the age of 14 At the age of 16 Peter-Paul moved to Canada. Peter-Paul represented Canada for the first time at the English Open in 1996 and has been with the national team for the past 12 years.

Peter-Paul can fluently speak Tamil, German, and English. He qualified to play table tennis in the 2008 Olympics for Canada.

Peter-Paul had a men's ITTF world ranking of 266th on 26 September 2011 with 1599 points.

References

External links
 ITTF Database

1977 births
Living people
Sportspeople from Colombo
Sportspeople from Ottawa
Canadian male table tennis players
Table tennis players at the 2007 Pan American Games
Table tennis players at the 2008 Summer Olympics
Table tennis players at the 2010 Commonwealth Games
Table tennis players at the 2011 Pan American Games
Olympic table tennis players of Canada
Canadian people of Sri Lankan Tamil descent
Pan American Games medalists in table tennis
Pan American Games bronze medalists for Canada
Medalists at the 2007 Pan American Games